Moscow Mint is a mint in Russia engaged in manufacturing of coins, medals and decorations. It also takes orders for minting coins for foreign countries. For example, the Moscow Mint produced the coins for Abkhazia, the Abkhazian apsar and many of the coins of India.  The mint fills individual orders for the manufacture of badges, medals and tokens.

The history of coinage in Moscow dates back several centuries, but the date of the founding of the modern enterprise is considered to be 25 April 1942. The Moscow Mint is part of the federal unitary enterprise, Goznak.

External links
 

Buildings and structures in Moscow
Finance in Russia
Mints (currency)
1942 establishments in Russia